The Spine Hits The Road is a live album by the group They Might Be Giants. It features tracks from various locations on their Spine Surfs The Hiway Tour. It is an iTunes exclusive album that was released on August 31, 2004.

Track listing
 "Experimental Film" – 3:05
 "Bastard Wants To Hit Me" – 2:27
 "Damn Good Times" – 2:38
 "John Lee Supertaster" – 3:08
 "I Palindrome I" – 2:27
 "Robot Parade" – 3:07
 "It's Kickin' In" – 1:58
 "Violin" – 6:41
 "Stalk Of Wheat" – 1:37
 "Fingertips" – 5:26
 "The End Of The Tour" - 3:28

External links
The Spine Hits The Road on This Might Be A Wiki

Self-released albums
ITunes-exclusive releases
They Might Be Giants live albums
2004 live albums
Idlewild Recordings live albums